The Capture of Tunis in 1569 was a campaign led by Uluç Ali to conquer Tunis.

In 1569 the Beylerbey of Algiers, Uluç Ali, set off over land toward Tunis with 5,300 Turks and 6000 Kabyle cavalry from the Kingdom of Kuku and the Kingdom of Beni Abbes.

Uluç Ali encountered the Hafsid Sultan at Beja, west of Tunis, Uluç Ali defeated him in battle and conquered Tunis without suffering any great losses. Mulay Ahmad III was forced to take refuge in the Spanish presidio of La Goleta in the bay of Tunis.

The Christian forces were able to recover Tunis in 1573 however the Ottoman forces under Uluç Ali conquered Tunis yet again in 1574.

References

Ottoman Algeria
16th-century conflicts
Ottoman Empire
Wars involving the Ottoman Empire
16th century in Ifriqiya